Batocera armata  is a species of flat-faced longhorn beetle in the subfamily Lamiinae of the family Cerambycidae. While originally named as "Cerambyx thomae" by Voet in 1778, no name was validly published for this species until 1800; Voet's 1778 work fails to fulfill the requirement in ICZN Article 11.4 that a work must be consistently binomial, and all names within that work are unavailable.

References

Batocerini
Beetles described in 1800
Beetles of Oceania